Solar power in Romania had an installed capacity of 1,374 megawatt (MW) as of the end of 2017. The country had in 2007 an installed capacity of 0.30 MW, which increased to 3.5 MW by the end of 2011, and to 6.5 MW by the end of 2012. However, the record year of 2013 was an exception, and new installation fell back from 1,100 MW to a moderate level of 69 MW in 2014.

Romania is located in an area with a good solar potential of 210 sunny days per year and with an annual solar energy flux between 1,000 kWh/m2/year and 1,300 kWh/m2/year. From this total amount around 600 to 800 kWh/m2/year is technically feasible. The most important solar regions of Romania are the Black Sea coast, Northern Dobruja and Oltenia with an average of 1,600 kWh/ m2/year.

One of the most important solar projects was the installation of a 30 kW solar panel on the roof of the Politehnica University of Bucharest that is capable of producing 60 MWh  of electricity per year.

Another Romanian city, Alba Iulia, installed a total of 1,700 PV cells on several public buildings that have a rated power of 257 kW. Other cities include Giurgiu with 174 solar panels and 391.5 kW installed capacity and Saturn with 50 panels and 112 kW installed capacity.

Installed PV capacity and Yearly production

Projects 

Many photovoltaic projects are planned for Romania, totaling over 200 MW, and of these, about 61 MW were expected to be completed by 2012. The first two industrial scale solar power plants in the country are the Singureni Solar Park completed in December 2010, and the Scornicesti Photovoltaic Park, completed 27 December 2011. Each is 1 MW. The Covaci Solar Park will be Romania's largest solar power plant at completion having a total of 480,000 solar panels with a combined capacity of 35 megawatts, and will be located in Timiș County. Another important site is the Gura Ialomiței Solar Park in Ialomița County which will have a capacity of 10 megawatts. Other solar parks include the Satu Mare Solar Park located in Satu Mare County which will have a capacity of 5 to 8 megawatts and the Sfântu Gheorghe Solar Park located in Covasna County that will have a capacity of 2.4 megawatts. A 32 MW project in four sections of 8 MW each is planned for Gătaia, and a 48 MW solar park is planned for Segarcea. A 1 GW project is planned to be constructed in 2023-2025.

Government support 
The Romanian State supports the production of solar / PV energy by offering six (6) green certificates for each MWh produced and injected into the grid. One green certificate will be traded on a regulated market (i.e. OPCOM) with a price that varies between EUR 27 to EUR 55 per green certificate, subject to indexation with the Euro zone inflation rate. However, due to the reduction of the cost of technology, the Romanian Energy Regulatory Body (i.e. ANRE) considers reducing the number of green certificate in the first half of 2012. In order to protect the interest of the solar / PV producers and for an appropriate guidance through the Romanian RES-E issues, the Romanian Photovoltaic Industry Association was created. Solar / PV energy is expected to be the second most active developed source of energy, after wind.

See also

 Photovoltaics
 Growth of photovoltaics
 Solar power by country
 Solar power in the European Union
 Energy in Romania
 Wind power in Romania
 Geothermal power in Romania
 Hydroelectricity in Romania
 Renewable energy by country

References

External links
 Romania Solar and Renewable Energy
 Renewable energy guide published by Wolf Theiss